Franciszek (Franciscus) Lilius (c. 1600 – 1657) was a Polish composer, a descendant of the Italian Giglis family. He significantly contributed to the musical culture of Warsaw in the 17th century. In 1630, he moved to Kraków, where he remained head of the cathedral orchestra until his death.

Best known works
Missa Brevissima
Missa tempore Paschali
Surrexit Christus Hodie, a motet

External links
Short bio

1600s births
1657 deaths
Polish Baroque composers
Polish classical composers
Polish male classical composers
17th-century classical composers
17th-century male musicians